Preston is a coastal village and suburb of Weymouth in south Dorset, England.

Preston contains two Haven campsites, Seaview and Weymouth Bay. It is home to a 14th-century church, St Andrew's, which was built on the site of a much earlier Norman church. It has three public houses: The Bridge Inn (formerly called The Swan), The Spice Ship and The Springhead. On the coast is the beach resort of Bowleaze Cove.

Preston has a village hall, used for many local groups including the local pantomime group.

Notable people
The Wesley family (the founders of Methodism) lived at Manor Cottage, which lies just south of The Spice Ship.

External links

 Preston Local History

Villages in Dorset
Geography of Weymouth, Dorset
Former civil parishes in Dorset